

Table
The 1991 National Soccer League First Division was the seventh edition of the NSL First Division in South Africa. It was won by Kaizer Chiefs.

References

1991